

External links 

2010 in United States case law